{{DISPLAYTITLE:C10H19O6PS2}}
The molecular formula C10H19O6PS2 (molar mass: 330.36 g/mol, exact mass: 330.0361 u) may refer to:

 Isomalathion
 Malathion